NGC 250 is a lenticular galaxy in the constellation
Pisces.

References

External links
 
 

0250
02765
0487
2765
Lenticular galaxies
18851110
Pisces (constellation)